Disney is a town in Mayes County, Oklahoma, United States. The population was 311 at the 2010 census.  The town is named for former Oklahoma U.S. Congressman Wesley E. Disney and has no affiliation with The Walt Disney Company or Walt Disney.

Overview
Disney is also known as "Disney Island" because it sits on an island at the southern shore of Grand Lake o' the Cherokees. Oklahoma State Highway 28 is the only road into and out of Disney.  To get into Disney from the west, one must drive across the 1-mile long Pensacola Dam.  To continue out of Disney, two more small dams with spillway gates must be crossed.  The northern part of Disney is lake-front, the southern part bounded by a wide stream.  The spillways from the two small dams join this stream.

Disney has a herd of "island deer" that, while wild and not kept in an enclosure, act more like dogs, strolling across main street (HwY 28) and nibbling on lawns, shrubs, and flowers.

There is a convenience store, a bait shop, a post office, two drive-ins, and a sporting goods / lake apparel store in the historic "Dam Hotel" building.  There are also offices for construction firms, a gift shop, two churches, and a church camp facility.

When the dam was built in the early 1930s, Disney was a different place—hundreds of workers, bosses, engineers, truck drivers, and all the services a large workforce would require were based in and near Disney.  The Rogers Cabins motel is the former "superintendents" quarters.  About 10 WPA era rock cabins, remodeled as motel rooms, are available. It is one of the few, if not the only, hotels / B&Bs, etc. on the southeast part of the lake. In the October 1938 issue of Scribner's magazine, famed artist Thomas Hart Benton wrote an article about Disney, titled "Thirty-Six Hours in a Boom Town".

Disney's growth is limited by the size of the island and the technical difficulties with bringing municipal services across the dams, so Disney has its own water plant, no public sewer system (all septic), and no natural gas service to houses.
The first church in Disney was built  by William J Morrow. He worked on the Dam from start to finish, he lived there with his family, wife Cora, children Dorothy, Billie, Jesse (Jake), Wayne, Deloris, & Bobbie Gene, Disney had no church, Mr. Morrow wanted a church for his family to go to,  so he built the first church Disney had. He went on to develop a large  part of the land around Grand Lake. The Morrows are a large family and many of them still live in Disney, Langley and all around the area.

The Picture in Scripture Amphitheater is 3.5 miles east of town, and on Fridays and Saturdays for several weeks during the summer presents the story of the apostle Paul.

Geography
Disney is located at  (36.477501, -95.020272).

Demographics

As of the 2010 Census Disney had a population of 311.  The racial and ethnic composition of the population was 73.0% white, 17.0% Native American, 0.3% from some other race, 9.6% reporting two or more races and 0.6% Hispanic or Latino from any race.

As of the census of 2000, there were 226 people, 124 households, and 56 families residing in the town. There were 252 housing units at an average density of 195.8 per square mile (75.4/km2). The racial makeup of the town was 80.53% White, 0.44% African American, 9.29% Native American, and 9.73% from two or more races. Hispanic or Latino of any race were 0.44% of the population.

There were 124 households, out of which 10.5% had children under the age of 18 living with them, 38.7% were married couples living together, 4.8% had a female householder with no husband present, and 54.8% were non-families. 46.8% of all households were made up of individuals, and 28.2% had someone living alone who was 65 years of age or older. The average household size was 1.82 and the average family size was 2.59.

In the town, the population was spread out, with 14.6% under the age of 18, 5.3% from 18 to 24, 24.8% from 25 to 44, 27.0% from 45 to 64, and 28.3% who were 65 years of age or older. The median age was 49 years. For every 100 females, there were 89.9 males. For every 100 females age 18 and over, there were 85.6 males.

The median income for a household in the town was $25,417, and the median income for a family was $36,875. Males had a median income of $36,250 versus $25,750 for females. The per capita income for the town was $16,975. About 21.4% of families and 24.8% of the population were below the poverty line, including 20.6% of those under the age of 18 and 21.3% of those 65 or over.

References

External links
 Encyclopedia of Oklahoma History and Culture - Disney
 Grand Lake Radio Network
 "Woman Chosen Mayor" United Press May 11, 1938

Towns in Mayes County, Oklahoma
Towns in Oklahoma